Players and pairs who neither have high enough rankings nor receive wild cards may participate in a qualifying tournament held one week before the annual Wimbledon Tennis Championships.

In 2016, the qualifiers were: Tatjana Maria, Amra Sadiković, Jana Čepelová, Aleksandra Krunić, Maria Sakkari, Julia Boserup, Tamira Paszek, Luksika Kumkhum, Mandy Minella, Ekaterina Alexandrova, Marina Erakovic and Paula Kania.

Duan Yingying received a lucky loser as a replacement for Victoria Azarenka, who withdrew because of injury.

Seeds

Qualifiers

Lucky losers

Qualifying draw

First qualifier

Second qualifier

Third qualifier

Fourth qualifier

Fifth qualifier

Sixth qualifier

Seventh qualifier

Eighth qualifier

Ninth qualifier

Tenth qualifier

Eleventh qualifier

Twelfth qualifier

References

External links
 Ladies' Qualifying Draw
2016 Wimbledon Championships – Women's draws and results at the International Tennis Federation

Women's Singles Qualifying
Wimbledon Championship by year – Women's singles qualifying
Wimbledon Championships